In Greek mythology, Erginus  was an Argonaut who piloted the Argo after the helmsman Tiphys died.

Family 
Erginus is said to be the son of Poseidon, and to have resided in the Carian city of Miletus, Yet others suggested he was a son of Periclymenus. Some authors identify him with another Erginus, king of Minyan Orchomenus.

Mythology 
During the funeral games which Hypsipyle celebrated at Lemnos in honour of her father Thoas, Erginus also contended for a prize. But he was ridiculed by the Lemnian women because of his grey hair, even though he was still young. However, Erginus defeated Boreads in the foot-race.

Notes

References 

 Apollonius Rhodius, Argonautica translated by Robert Cooper Seaton (1853-1915), R. C. Loeb Classical Library Volume 001. London, William Heinemann Ltd, 1912. Online version at the Topos Text Project.
 Apollonius Rhodius, Argonautica. George W. Mooney. London. Longmans, Green. 1912. Greek text available at the Perseus Digital Library.
 Gaius Julius Hyginus, Fabulae from The Myths of Hyginus translated and edited by Mary Grant. University of Kansas Publications in Humanistic Studies. Online version at the Topos Text Project.
 Gaius Valerius Flaccus, Argonautica translated by Mozley, J H. Loeb Classical Library Volume 286. Cambridge, MA, Harvard University Press; London, William Heinemann Ltd. 1928. Online version at theio.com.
 Gaius Valerius Flaccus, Argonauticon. Otto Kramer. Leipzig. Teubner. 1913. Latin text available at the Perseus Digital Library.
 Pindar, Odes translated by Diane Arnson Svarlien. 1990. Online version at the Perseus Digital Library.
 Pindar, The Odes of Pindar including the Principal Fragments with an Introduction and an English Translation by Sir John Sandys, Litt.D., FBA. Cambridge, MA., Harvard University Press; London, William Heinemann Ltd. 1937. Greek text available at the Perseus Digital Library.
 The Orphic Argonautica, translated by Jason Colavito. © Copyright 2011. Online version at the Topos Text Project.

Further reading 
 William Smith. A Dictionary of Greek and Roman biography and mythology. s.v. Erginus. London (1848). 

Argonauts

Children of Poseidon
Demigods in classical mythology
Anatolian characters in Greek mythology